= Sleep the Season =

- Origin: Welland, Ontario, Canada
- Genres: Alternative pop
- Years active: 2005–2009
- Labels: Faint and Hearted Records
- Past members: Dave Fontaine; Greg Goertzen; Justin Fortier; Ben Audet; Trevor Speechly; Mike Harris
- Website: sleeptheseason.com

Sleep the Season are a Canadian alternative pop music group formed in Welland in 2005. Their specialty is playing acoustic instruments only and using a cello.

== History ==
Their first album Under Stars was released on September 5, 2005 and contained 5 songs. The second album Don't make a move was released on September 4, 2006 and contained 13 songs. Four Songs was released on February 11, 2008 and was their first independent release.

The original band members are Ben Audet, Dave Fontaine, Greg Goertzen and Justin Fortier. According to the MySpace site of Sleep the Season the band has now five band members. Trevor Speechly is the new bass player and Mike Harris is their new drummer.

Sleep the Season announced that the band was ending (October 2009) and their final show would be on December 27, 2009 at the Merchant Ale House in St. Catharines, Ontario. The show would also be the release of their final EP Anyone but You.

== Band members ==
Final lineup

- Dave Fontaine – lead vocals
- Greg Goertzen – cello
- Justin Fortier – guitar
- Trevor Speechly – bass guitar
- Mike Harris - drums

Past members

- Ben Audet – drums, vocals

== Discography ==
Date of Release	Title	Label
2005	Under Stars	Faint and Hearted Records
2006	Don't make a move	Faint and Hearted Records
2008	Four Songs	Independent
2009	Anyone But You	Independent

== Awards ==
Year	Event	Won	Nominated
2006	Pulse Niagara Music Awards	Best local single of 2006 and second in best local album artwork	
